Slump may refer to:

Slump (economics), better known as a recession
Slump (food), a variety of cobbler
Slump (geology), a form of mass wasting event
"Slump" (song), by South Korean boy band Stray Kids
Slump (sports), a period in which a player or team performs below par
Sophomore slump, a failed second effort following a successful introduction
Senior slump, decreased motivation during a final year of studies
Retirement slump, the average falloff in the party's vote when the incumbent retires
Slumping, a categorical description of an area of techniques for the forming of glass by applying heat to the point where the glass becomes plastic
Dr. Slump, anime and manga, character
The workability of a concrete mixture, as determined by a concrete slump test